Strambinello is a comune (municipality) in the Metropolitan City of Turin in the Italian region Piedmont, located about 40 km north of Turin.

References

Cities and towns in Piedmont